Heitor Villa-Lobos's Étude No. 4 ("de acordes repetidos"), part of his Twelve Études for Guitar, was first published by Max Eschig, Paris, in 1953.

Structure
The piece shows the influence of folk guitar music, is in G major, and is marked Un peu modéré .

Analysis
Étude No. 4 is a chord study, but does not employ all of the harmonic and polyphonic resources of the instrument .

References

Cited sources

Further reading
 Villa-Lobos, sua obra. 1989. Third edition. Rio de Janeiro: MinC-SPHAN/Pró-Memória, Museu Villa-Lobos. Online edition, 2009
 Wright, Simon. 1992. Villa-Lobos. Oxford Studies of Composers. Oxford and New York: Oxford University Press.  (cloth);  (pbk).

Compositions by Heitor Villa-Lobos
Guitar études
Compositions in G major